Amado Alonso (13 September 1896, Lerín Navarre, Spain – 26 May 1952, Arlington, Massachusetts) was a Spanish philologist, linguist and literary critic, who became a naturalised citizen of Argentina and one of the founders of stylistics.

He was a pupil of Ramón Menéndez Pidal at the Center for Historical Studies in Madrid, where he worked on phonetic and geographical linguistics. Between 1927 and 1946 he lived in Buenos Aires, where he headed the Institute of Philology. He then went to Harvard University and lived in America until his death.

Work
Alonso studied a variety of linguistic topics including phonetics, dialectology and lexis. He showed a keen interest in the study of his native language while contributing directly to the Latin American academic world. Without diverging from Menéndez Pidal's philological orientation, Alonso adopted a clearly linguistic research project. The works of Hispanoamerican authors, especially Bello and Cuervo, had impacted his studies and research. His comparative studies on American Spanish have contributed to a greater linguistic appreciation to the language.

His first published work was in the field of language history, showing derivations of modern Spanish words such as Augustu > agosto and auguriu > agüero (1922). From then until 1927 he wrote eight other articles, most of them published in the Revista de Filología Española. Alonso published some of his most important works between 1928 and 1938 while residing in Buenos Aires. His numerous articles in newspapers and magazines were collected and published in linguistic studio, but his two-volume work, "From medieval to modern Spanish pronunciation" was published post-posthumously by Rafael Lapesa 1955.

Alonso popularized the structuralist methodology and the main philosophical currents of his time. In 1945 he translated a Course in General Linguistics by Ferdinand de Saussure, who added an important preface, as he had done with the work of Charles Bally and Karl Vossler.

While at Harvard he founded the Nueva Revista de Filología Española published by the Colegio de Mexico, to reignite the spirit of the Revista de Filología Española, created and directed by him in Buenos Aires from 1939 to 1946.

Publications

 Estructura de las sonatas de Valle Inclán (1928) – (The structure of the Valle Inclán Sonnets)
 El problema de la lengua en América (1935) – (The language problem in America)
 Castellano, español, idioma nacional. Historia espiritual de tres nombres (1938) – (Castillian, Spanish, National language. The spiritual History of the three names)
 Gramática Castellana (Primer curso, 1938; Segundo curso, 1939) En colaboración con Pedro Henríquez Ureña. – (Spanish Grammar – First course, 1938; Second course, 1939 – In collaboration with Pedro Henríquez Ureña)
 Poesía y estilo de Pablo Neruda (1940) – (The poetry and style of Pablo Neruda)
 Ensayo sobre la novela histórica: El modernismo (1942) – (Essay on the historic novel: Modernism)
 Traducción y prólogo del Curso de Lingüística General de F. de Saussure (1945) – (Translation and preface to the General Linguistics Course of F. de Saussure)
 Estudios lingüísticos. Temas españoles (1951) – (Linguistic studies. Spanish issues)
 Estudios lingüísticos. Temas hispanoamericanos (1953) – (Linguistic studies. Latin-American issues)
 Materia y forma en poesía (1955) – (Matter and form in poetry)
 De la pronunciación medieval a la moderna en español (1955) – (From medieval to modern Spanish pronunciation)

References

1896 births
1952 deaths
People from Ribera del Alto Ebro
Spanish philologists
Linguists from Spain
Spanish literary critics
Argentine philologists
Linguists from Argentina
Argentine literary critics
20th-century linguists
Harvard University faculty
Spanish emigrants to Argentina
20th-century philologists